The Bangabandhu Cup, also known as the Bangabandhu Gold Cup, is an international football tournament organised by the Bangladesh Football Federation (BFF) as a tribute to Bangabandhu Sheikh Mujibur Rahman who is the founding father of Bangladesh. It has been played sporadically since 1996, and was resurrected in 2015.

Up to the 2016 edition, most of the participating countries in the tournament sent their youth national teams, their second teams or club sides. In the 2018 edition, all participating nations sent their first team except the Philippines.

Palestine is the champion, after defeating Tajikistan in the 2018 tournament and defended its trophy against Burundi in 2020.

Results

Tournament summary

Top goalscorers

Top goalscorers by edition

Venues
 Bangabandhu National Stadium
 Sylhet District Stadium
 Bangladesh Army Stadium
 M. A. Aziz Stadium
 Cox's Bazar Stadium

References

External links
 

 
International association football competitions hosted by Bangladesh
Memorials to Sheikh Mujibur Rahman
Annual sporting events
Recurring sporting events established in 1996
1996 establishments in Bangladesh